Rhamnidium is a genus of flowering plants in the family Rhamnaceae.

Species include:

Rhamnidium caloneurum Standl.
Rhamnidium dictyophyllum Urb.
Rhamnidium elaeocarpum
Rhamnidium glabrum
Rhamnidium hasslerianum
Rhamnidium molle

References

 
Taxonomy articles created by Polbot
Rhamnaceae genera